Man Yanling  is a Chinese  football player. She was part of the Chinese team at the 1995 FIFA Women's World Cup and 1999 FIFA Women's World Cup, where the team placed fourth and second, respectively.

References

1972 births
Living people
Chinese women's footballers
Asian Games medalists in football
1995 FIFA Women's World Cup players
1999 FIFA Women's World Cup players
China women's international footballers
Women's association football defenders
Medalists at the 1998 Asian Games
Asian Games gold medalists for China
Footballers at the 1998 Asian Games